Mustafa Fehmi Kubilay (1906- December 23, 1930) was a Turkish teacher and a lieutenant (Turkish: Asteğmen) in the Turkish army. He is considered a "Martyr of the Revolution" ("Devrim Şehidi") in Turkey.

Biography

Kubilay, the son of Hüseyin and Zeynep, who were Cretan Turks, was born Mustafa Fehmi in Kozan, Adana, Ottoman Empire in 1906. His parents had fled to Turkey prior to the population exchange to escape massacres and persecution. He received his basic education in Aydın from 1913 to 1919, and began a tailors apprenticeship. During his apprenticeship he passed the examination for enrollment into teachers training, he received his teachers credentials in 1926. Mustafa Fehmi adopted a surname after graduation in accordance with Kemalist policies and chose the name Kubilay. Kubilay taught in Aydın and later at Zafer Elementary School in Menemen. He was posted in Menemen during his compulsory military service. Kubilay was married to Fatma Vedide in a civil ceremony in Aydın. He had a son, Vedat Aktuğ.

Lieutenant Kubilay was killed and beheaded by the Naqshbandi (Turkish: Nakşibendi) order Sufi protesters after the troops he commanded fired with wooden bullets into the crowd of armed demonstrators in the Menemen Incident. Lieutenant Kubilay was beheaded, his head impaled on a flagstaff and was paraded around Menemen by the insurgents. The rioters, who sought the return to Sharia law and the Caliphate were all soon arrested and tried by courts-martial. Lieutenant Kubilay became a secular martyr for Atatürk's new republic.

Zafer Elementary School in Menemen where Kubilay taught was renamed Kubilay Elementary School (Turkish: Kubilay İlkokulu) in his honor. Kubilay Secondary School (Turkish: Kubilay Ortaokulu) in Menemen is also named in his memory.

A memorial parade is held by the army annually on 23 December at (the) Martyr Kubilay Memorial (Turkish: Şehit Kubilay Anıtı) located on a hill over-looking Menemen; in remembrance of Kubilay and the two municipal watchmen; Bekçi Hasan and Bekçi Şevki who were also killed in the incident. The monument features a tall sculpture by Ratip Aşir Acudoğlu which was erected in 1932. The Kubilay Memorial is a part of Kubilay Barracks, but open to the public. A military honor guard stands continuous watch at the memorial site, which contains the graves of several Turkish soldiers who were killed in the line of duty.

Background of the Incident

References
 
  Radikal, 1930 Menemen Olayı bir Nakşibendi tertibi miydi. Ayşe Hür, 30/12/2014 
  Kubilay Secondary School official site. T.C. MİLLÎ EĞİTİM BAKANLIĞI İZMİR - MENEMEN - KUBİLAY ORTAOKULU
 
 M. Fehmi Kubilay. Official Menemen municipal website, retrieved 21 June 2014.
  Hurriyet Ege, news article 24 December 2000. We commemorate the martyr Kubilay, retrieved 21 June 2014. 
  Turkish Armed Forces. Turkish General Staff. Document Archives, retrieved 21 June 2014.

Turkish schoolteachers
Turkish military officers
1906 births
1930 deaths
People from İzmir
People killed by Islamic terrorism
Deaths by decapitation